The enzyme D-arabinonolactonase (EC 3.1.1.30) the reaction 

D-arabinono-1,4-lactone + H2O  D-arabinonate

This enzyme belongs to the family of hydrolases, specifically those acting on carboxylic ester bonds.  The systematic name is D-arabinono-1,4-lactone lactonohydrolase.

References 

 

EC 3.1.1
Enzymes of unknown structure